Jo&Joe is a French hotel brand owned by Accor. Launched in 2016, the brand manages 2 hotels in France as of 2019.

History 
In September 2016, the group Accor announced the launch of a new hotel brand, Jo&Joe, a new open house experience geared for Millennials. 50 openings by 2020 were announced. The first location opened in March 2017 in Hossegor, a surf capital on the Atlantic coast of Southern France. The 70-room hotel was designed in partnership with the surfwear brands Quiksilver and Roxy.

In 2018, Accor announced the 2020 opening of a 350-bed Jo&Joe hotel in the Largo do Boticário architectural complex of Rio de Janeiro, Brazil, and another 2020 opening of a 160-bed Jo&Joe hotel on rue Buzenval in Paris, France.

In 2019, the opening of a new Jo&Joe in London’s Rex Cinema was announced, along with openings in Dubai, Thailand, and in the new City Ikea in Vienna. In April 2019, Jo&Joe opened its second location in Gentilly near Paris' Cité Internationale Universitaire.

Development

See also 

 Accor
hotelF1

References

External links 

 Official website

Hospitality companies of France
Hotels established in 2016
Accor